Khudabandino (Xoźaybändä) is a rural locality (a village) in Surensky Selsoviet, Zianchurinsky District, Bashkortostan, Russia. The population was 112 as of 2010. There are 2 streets.

Geography 
Khudabandino is located 30 km east of Isyangulovo (the district's administrative centre) by road. Kugarchi is the nearest rural locality.

References 

Rural localities in Zianchurinsky District